Theodore Matthew Michael Kuhn Jr. (September 21, 1932 – November 20, 2022) was an American actor. He started his career as a child actor, active on-screen during the Golden Age of Hollywood from the 1930s until the early 1950s. He is noted for having played Beau Wilkes in Gone with the Wind (1939).

Kuhn also appeared in Juarez (1939), A Tree Grows in Brooklyn (1945), The Strange Love of Martha Ivers (1946), Red River (1948), Broken Arrow (1950), and A Streetcar Named Desire (1951).

Biography

Career as a child star
Kuhn was born on September 21, 1932, in Waukegan, Illinois, to Theodore Matthew Michael Kuhn Sr. and Pearl Bernadette (née Hicks). He had a sister, Bernadette, who was twelve years older. In 1934, the family moved to Los Angeles as a result of the Great Depression. Kuhn appeared as a toddler in the 1934 film Change of Heart, after a woman spotted him with his mother in Santa Monica and informed her of a Fox Film casting call, believing Kuhn and the woman's toddler could play twins. His parents enrolled him at the Mar-Ken School for performing children, where he became friends with acting brothers Dwayne and Darryl Hickman.

Kuhn considered Juarez (1939) his "big break", having been chosen from more than 50 children for the role. Afterwards, he was selected for the role of Beau Wilkes in Gone with the Wind, recalling that the receptionist at the casting call told him "Mickey, we've been waiting for you", and instantly announced the role had been filled. Kuhn went on to appear as the adoptive son of John Wayne's character in Red River in 1948 and then in Broken Arrow in 1950 starring James Stewart.
 
The film A Streetcar Named Desire (1951) reunited him with Vivien Leigh twelve years after they first worked together in Gone with the Wind. In A Streetcar Named Desire, Kuhn played a sailor who directs Leigh's character Blanche to the correct streetcar which will take her to her sister's neighborhood at the beginning of the film. He therefore achieved the distinction of being the only actor to share screen time with Leigh in each of her Academy Award-winning performances, and following the death of Dame Olivia de Havilland on July 26, 2020, he became the last surviving credited cast member in both films.

Navy career
Kuhn served in the U.S. Navy from 1951 until 1955 and worked as an aircraft electrician there.

Post-acting career
After finishing his Navy service, Kuhn attempted to return to acting, briefly appearing in the TV anthology Alfred Hitchcock Presents,  but was only offered television roles which he found unappealing. He left the film business in 1956 to attend college, and worked for American Airlines from 1965 to 1995 and the Boston airport in administrative positions until his retirement. He regularly visited film festivals dealing with his films.

Kuhn was married five times. His first marriage, to Jean Marie Hannick, lasted from 1956 until 1962; they had two children, including son Theodore Matthew Michael III. He was later married to Shannon Farnon, Rosa Negrete, and Yolanda Borbon, all of which ended in divorce. His last wife, an American Airlines co-worker named Barbara Traci, was married to him from 1985 until his death.

Death
Kuhn had been living in Naples, Florida, and volunteered four hours per week at a local hospital. He died at a hospice facility in Naples on November 20, 2022, aged 90.

Awards
In 2005, Kuhn received a Golden Boot Award, an award given to acknowledge significant contributions to the Western genre.

Filmography

Citations

General and cited references 
 
 Holmstrom, John (1996). The Moving Picture Boy: An International Encyclopaedia from 1895 to 1995. Norwich: Michael Russell, p. 178.

External links
 

1932 births
2022 deaths
American male film actors
American male child actors
American people of German descent
Actors from Waukegan, Illinois
Male actors from Illinois
Military personnel from Illinois
20th-century American male actors